Toghrol Tower (also transliterated Toghrul, Tughrol, or Tughrul) is a 12th-century monument, located in the city of Rey, Iran. Tuğrul Tower is near Rashkan Castle.

The  brick tower is the tomb of Seljuk ruler Tughril, who died in Rey in 1063. Originally, like other monuments of its time, it was capped by a conical dome (گنبد, gonbad), which collapsed during an earthquake.

The thickness of the walls varies from 1.75 to 2.75 meters. The inner and outer diameters are 11 and 16 meters, respectively. The exterior shape is that of a polygon with 24 angles in its design, which is thought to contribute to the structure's stability against tremors.

At the top of the tower, Kufic inscriptions were originally observable.

The tower is protected by Iran's Cultural Heritage Organization.

In some texts this place is called Burj Khalifa Yazid. According to some experts' ideas, this tower is like a clock pointer and the time can be recognized by the sunshine on its congresses.

History 
It is said that one of the uses of this tower was to use it on foggy nights by lighting a fire on its high barrier to guide the travelers of the Silk Road coming from Khorasan to Rey, and to meet the chronological needs of the people during the day. According to Manouchehr Arian in the article "Another Look at the Towers", calling the term "tower" to this building and similar buildings refers to the annual moving passageways of sunlight in Zodiacal. In addition to this feature, Toghrol Tower has another unique feature called the sundial that is hidden in the heart of its congresses.  
Naser al-Din Shah ordered some restorations to be made to the top part of the tower, which was collapsing in 1884.

Burial dispute 

There are many challenges and discrepancies between experts and historians about the character buried in this building. Some consider it to be the tomb of Tughral Beyk of Seljuk, and it is stated in the “Mahmalottavarikh” book on page 465 that "Sultan Tughralibek died in the city of Rey and his tomb is there." Turkish historian, Faregh Sumer also considers the burial place of Toghrol in the same location.
Other writers consider this place to be the burial place of Khalil Sultan, the son of Timur Lang and his wife Shadalmolk in the 15th century. In the book of Reye Baastaan (the ancient Ray) authoring Hassan Karimiyan is mentioned that a group attributes this monument to Fakhr Deilami.
Mohammad Mohit Tabatabai considered this building to belong to Ibrahim Khawas and he himself was buried next to this tower in 1992.

Decline and restoration 
As mentioned above, Toghrol Tower was first renovated in 1922 and at the end of the 35th year of the reign of Nasser al-Din Shah. This restoration was carried out by the order of the Shah and by the Chancellor Amin al-Sultan and by Abul Hassan Khan Memarbashi and marble slabs were installed on the entrance of the building. This reconstruction saved the building from the danger of destruction, but destroyed the elegance of the old works and the tomb of the Kufic inscription. After the Revolution of 1978, this building was abandoned until it was rebuilt again in the early seventies, and seriously began in mid-1998 and ended in the winter of 2000.
Reconstruction is currently underway by District 20 of Tehran Municipality in an area of 2 hectares in order to expand and build a cultural center, library, museum and restaurant.

Gallery

See also
Architecture of Iran
Gonbad-e Qabus (tower)

References

 Sumer F(2001).Aghoozha(Turkmanha),HajTalaei.
 Raazi A.Alnaghz.
Toqrol Tower, Ray
 https://web.archive.org/web/20081230182132/http://www.tehranmiras.ir/history/haydary2/rey_files/togrol_rey.htm
 https://web.archive.org/web/20120113070012/http://www.ketabeavval.ir/Tehran/1912.aspx
 https://web.archive.org/web/20080504225044/http://www.chn.ir/News/?section=2&id=24644
 :fa:%D8%A8%D8%B1%D8%AC %D8%B7%D8%BA%D8%B1%D9%84

Architecture in Iran
Towers in Iran
Buildings and structures in Tehran Province
National works of Iran